This page is about the Latin praenomen. For a list of prominent individuals with this name, see Statius (disambiguation).
Statius is a Latin praenomen, or personal name, which was used during the period of the Roman Republic, and into imperial times. It was not widely used at Rome, but gave rise to the patronymic gens Statilia. The feminine form is Statia. It is not usually abbreviated, but is sometimes found with the abbreviations St. and Sta.

Origin and meaning of the name
Although it was occasionally used by families of Latin origin, the praenomen Statius occurs much more frequently in Oscan gentes, and particularly amongst the Samnites. Chase concludes that the name is clearly of Oscan origin, although it may be that it belongs to that class of names which was common to both Oscan and Latin.

Aulus Gellius recorded the tradition that Statius was a name originally given to persons of servile origin. This belief probably arose because many of the people who bore this name at Rome arrived as captives taken during wars between Rome and various Oscan peoples. However, this belief also must have helped to prevent Statius from becoming a popular name at Rome. It is ironic that this tradition was recorded by Gellius, whose nomen reveals his own family's Oscan origin.

Notes

Ancient Roman praenomina